503rd or 503d may refer to:

503d Air Defense Group, inactive United States Air Force organization
503d Aircraft Control and Warning Group (AC&WG), inactive United States Air Force unit
503d Aircraft Control Group, inactive United States Air Force unit
503d Fighter Squadron, unit of the New York Air National Guard that flies the C-130 Hercules
503rd Heavy Panzer Battalion, German heavy Panzer Abteilung equipped with Tiger I tanks and Panzer IIIs during World War II
503rd Infantry Regiment (United States), formerly the 503rd Parachute Infantry Regiment (PIR), an airborne unit in the United States military
503rd SS Heavy Panzer Battalion or 103rd SS Heavy Panzer Battalion, originally formed as the II.Battalion, 11 SS Panzer Regiment

See also
503 (number)
503, the year 503 (DIII) of the Julian calendar
503 BC